Giorgio Mazza (born 23 September 1939) is a retired Italian hurdler. He competed at the 1964 Olympics in the 110 m hurdles and finished in eighth place.

Biography
Mazza won three national 110 m titles, in 1957, 1958 and 1963. He achieved his personal best of 13.9 seconds in July 1964 in Reggio Emilia. The Italian record currently belongs to Andrea Giaconi with 13.35 seconds.

Achievements

References

External links
 

1939 births
Living people
Italian male hurdlers
Athletes (track and field) at the 1964 Summer Olympics
Athletics competitors of Fiamme Oro
Olympic athletes of Italy
Universiade medalists in athletics (track and field)
Mediterranean Games bronze medalists for Italy
Mediterranean Games medalists in athletics
Athletes (track and field) at the 1963 Mediterranean Games
Universiade gold medalists for Italy
Universiade silver medalists for Italy
Universiade bronze medalists for Italy
Medalists at the 1959 Summer Universiade
Medalists at the 1963 Summer Universiade